Freemansburg may refer to:
Freemansburg, Pennsylvania, a borough in Northampton County, Pennsylvania
Freemansburg, West Virginia, a community in Lewis County, West Virginia